Frederick Victor Fairweather (3 June 1913 – 20 February 1983) was an Australian rules footballer who played with North Melbourne in the Victorian Football League (VFL).

Fairweather, who played in the ruck, was a later comer to VFL football, just two weeks shy of his 31st birthday when he started playing for North Melbourne. Born in London, he played his initial football for South Melbourne City, before joining Port Melbourne in 1937. He was a member of Port's 1940 and 1941 premiership teams. After having served with the AIF, Fairweather played 15 games for North Melbourne in 1944 and appeared in all 21 games that they played the following year, including a semi final. He was club captain for the 1946 VFL season, then retired at the end of the year, to take up a position as captain-coach of Carnegie.

References

1913 births
1983 deaths
Australian rules footballers from Victoria (Australia)
North Melbourne Football Club players
Port Melbourne Football Club players
VFL/AFL players born in England
English emigrants to Australia
Australian Army personnel of World War II